Zain may refer to:

People
Zain (name)
Zain (gamer)

Business and economy
Zain Group, a Gulf telecommunications company
Zain Jordan, telecommunications company in Jordan
Zain Saudi Arabia, a Saudi mobile telecommunication company
Zain Sudan, formerly Mobitel Sudan, mobile telephone network operator in Sudan

Other uses
Zayin, the seventh letter in several Semitic alphabets
Zain, a mind control weapon from the Strider Manga and NES Game
Zain Club, formerly known as Fastlink Basketball Club, Jordanian basketball club based in Amman, Jordan

See also
Zane (disambiguation)
Zayn (disambiguation)
Zayn ad-Din (disambiguation)
Zein (disambiguation)